McCauley Weir is a weir located near Nanango, Queensland, Australia. It was originally constructed as a water supply for Nanango in 1953. It has since ceased to be used as a water supply and is only used by nearby farms for stock use.

It is located on Cooyar Creek.

Recreation 
When open, the weir is a popular spot with canoeists, fishers, bushwalkers and deer hunters (Hunting only on Private Property, hunting needs property owners permission). Small motorised craft is permitted, though no high horsepower petrol motors are allowed. Due to flood damage the road to the weir has been closed since 2003. Despite lobbying by local community groups, in 2012 the South Burnett Regional Council voted against reopening the road.  Mayor Wayne Kratzmann said in 2013 that the road was too dangerous to reopen in its current state, and the council did not have funds to repair it.  As of July 2021, the road remains closed to the public.

Waterway Barrier & Native Fish
Cooyar Creek was once home to the Brisbane River Cod but has been extinct since the 1940s, mainly due to over fishing, poor land practices and mining activities. A recovery project started in 2019 to restore cod to the upper Brisbane River & tributaries has seen Mary River Cod released in the Brisbane River & lower Cooyar Creek. However the weir itself is a water barrier to fish migration so will have a detrimental effect on native fish species & cod recovery efforts on Cooyar Creek.

See also

List of dams and reservoirs in Australia

References

Reservoirs in Queensland
Wide Bay–Burnett
Dams in Queensland